Russell G. Schuh (born Russell Galen Schuh; March 14, 1941, in Corvallis, Oregon – November 8, 2016, in Los Angeles, California) was an American linguist known for his extensive work on Chadic languages, especially Hausa and West Chadic languages.

Early life
Schuh was born on March 14, 1941, in Corvallis, Oregon. He spent his childhood in Klamath Falls, Oregon.

Education
Schuh graduated with a B.A. degree in French from the University of Oregon in 1963, an M.A. degree in French from Northwestern University in 1964, and a Ph.D. degree in 1972 from the University of California, Los Angeles. For his doctoral dissertation, he studied under Paul Newman and performed fieldwork on Ngizim at Potiskum, Yobe State.

From 1965–1967, he was a Peace Corps volunteer in Agadez, Niger, where he learned to speak Hausa and worked with a Tamazhaq disc jockey for Radio Niger. He also spent 1973-1975 doing fieldwork in Gashua, Nigeria.

Career
Schuh was a leading scholar in Chadic languages.

From 1982–1983, he was a visiting professor at Ahmadu Bello University in Zaria, Kaduna State, Nigeria.

In 2015, he became Distinguished Professor at UCLA.

Personal life
Schuh was an avid marathon runner.

References

External links
Publications
UCLA Yobe Languages Project

1941 births
2016 deaths
Linguists of Chadic languages
Linguists from the United States
People from Corvallis, Oregon
University of California, Los Angeles alumni
University of California, Los Angeles faculty
Linguists of Hausa